Casablanca Finance City Tower or CFC Tower is a 28–story office building in Casablanca, Morocco. At 136 meters in height, it is the tallest structure in Morocco, with the exception of the minaret of the Hassan II Mosque. It is located in the Casablanca Finance City, built at the site of the former Casablanca–Anfa Airport. It was designed by Morphosis Architects.

See also 

 List of tallest buildings in Morocco
 List of tallest buildings in Africa
 Casablanca Finance City

References 

Casablanca
Skyscrapers in Morocco